The Temple of the Augustinians, alternatively the Church of the Augustinians (French: ,) in Brussels, Belgium, was a Brabantine Baroque-style church designed and built from 1621 to 1642 by the architect Jacob Franquart for the Augustinians order. It was located on the Place de Brouckère/De Brouckèreplein in central Brussels until its demolition in 1893–94. Its facade's masonry, however, was preserved, being disassembled and reconstructed as the facade of the Church of the Holy Trinity in Ixelles.

History

Early history
The Augustinians settled in Brussels in 1589 and occupied the convent of the Brethren of the Common Life, which had been located on the banks of the river Senne in the centre of the city since 1336. The church was built from 1620 to 1642 in the Brabantine Baroque style according to plans by the architect Jacob Franquart. Closed by French revolutionary troops in 1796, the church, as the only remaining part of the convent, reopened for Roman Catholic worship in 1805. In the run-up to the Battle of Waterloo (1815), it served as an arsenal for British troops and subsequently as a military hospital.

Under Dutch rule, the building was designated a Protestant place of worship, alongside the Brussels Protestant Church on the /, and the Dutch Church (Nederlandse gemeente) met in the Temple from 1816 until the Belgian Revolution in 1830. The first Reformed service was held on 1 September 1816, and Hermannus Pauw (b. 1770) and Dirk Rijke (1789–1830) served as ministers from 1816 until 1830. On 27 March 1817, the future King William III of the Netherlands was baptised in the Temple. Anglican Reverend Holworthy, chaplain to the British Ambassador, held English-language services in the Temple until 1829.

The last Protestant service was held on 21 August 1830. From 5 September, the building was occupied by Belgian patriots. Many of the worshippers fled the city and the Dutch Church was left without a building, meeting in various locations before it eventually built its own premises at Zuidkaai in 1857.

Later usage, demolition and partial rebuilding
After 1830, the Temple served various purposes; for performances, exhibitions, and even as a post office. It survived the covering of the Senne (1867–1871), a drastic destruction and renovation of downtown Brussels. At the centre of the Place de Brouckère/De Brouckèreplein, the church’s facade was intended by the architect Léon Suys to be one of the focal points of new central boulevards. The work to cover the river, which nearly surrounded the church, preserved the integrity of the building at great trouble and expense, but it was finally demolished in 1893, its style no longer popular with the people and its presence unsuitable for the area. The church was replaced by a fountain-obelisk dedicated to the memory the former mayor of the City of Brussels, Jules Anspach (1829–1879).

The Temple was demolished in 1893–94. Its facade's masonry, however, was preserved, being disassembled and reconstructed as the facade of the Church of the Holy Trinity on the / in Ixelles. Its Baroque pulpit by Marc de Vos (1697) now adorns the Church of Our Blessed Lady of the Sablon in the Sablon/Zavel district. The /, a side street leading into the Place de Brouckère from the south-west, still reminds of the Temple's former presence there.

See also

 List of churches in Brussels
 History of Brussels
 Belgium in "the long nineteenth century"

References

Notes

Bibliography
 
 
 
 
 

Protestant churches in Belgium
Roman Catholic churches in Brussels
City of Brussels
History of Brussels
17th-century Roman Catholic church buildings in Belgium